is a 2021 Japanese animated superhero film based on an original story featuring the characters of My Hero Academia manga series by Kōhei Horikoshi. Produced by Bones and distributed by Toho, the third film of the franchise is directed by Kenji Nagasaki from a script written by Yōsuke Kuroda and stars Daiki Yamashita, Nobuhiko Okamoto, and Yuki Kaji as part of an ensemble cast. In the film, taking place during the Endeavor Agency arc of the manga, Izuku Midoriya and his classmates join the Pro-Heroes around the world for a mission to stop a terrorist plan that will bring an end to humanity.

A third film was initially teased in November 2020 with a key visual featuring Midoriya, Katsuki Bakugo, and Shoto Todoroki. One week after it was first announced, the film was officially confirmed for a 2021 release. Its full title was revealed in March 2021 along with the announcement of the release date. Horikoshi was credited for the original story in the film and the original characters' designs.

The film premiered in Japan on August 6, 2021, and was released in the United States and Canada on October 29. It received generally positive reviews from critics, who praised the animation and plot but criticized the character development. The film grossed over million worldwide and received a nomination at the Newtype Anime Awards.

Plot

A doomsday cult known as Humarise believes that Quirks will eventually become so powerful that they will bring about the extinction of humanity. Because of this, they have planted bombs all over the world filled with "Trigger" gas which kills Quirk users by driving their Quirks out of control and dying in the process. Their leader, Flect Turn, plans to use these bombs to save humanity by killing the Quirk population. 

After Humarise detonates its first Trigger Bomb, the World Heroes Association dispatches Pro Heroes and U.A. High Hero Course students to Humarise's targets in hopes of disarming the remaining bombs. Izuku Midoriya, Katsuki Bakugo, and Shoto Todoroki are among those sent to Humarise's supposed main headquarters in the country of Otheon. None of the Heroes find any trace of Humarise and they are put on standby. During an outing, Midoriya, Bakugo and Todoroki encounter a jewel robbery in progress. Todoroki and Bakugo pursue the thieves while Midoriya gives chase to their courier, Rody Soul, a street urchin who took the job to provide for his younger siblings. 

Meanwhile, Allan Kay, a Humarise scientist, flees with an important briefcase but is attacked by a Humarise agent, Beros, and he crashes his car in the midst of Midoriya and Rody's chase. Rody accidentally grabs Kay's briefcase shortly before Midoriya catches him. They are soon attacked by the police, but Midoriya escapes with Rody using Blackwhip. Midoriya is publicly accused of mass murder by Otheon's chief of police, who is a member of Humarise, and goes off the grid per Todoroki's advice. Midoriya and Rody make their way to the neighboring country of Klayd, where the Otheon police will not have jurisdiction. Midoriya sends a coded message about his new destination to Todoroki, who heads off with Bakugo to join him there. 

That night, Rody becomes homesick and secretly reports the briefcase to the police. The officers that arrive turn out to be Humarise agents, who attack him. Midoriya, having been woken up by Rody's bird companion, Pino, saves him, but is wounded by Beros during the fight. Rody apologizes to Midoriya while patching him up, explaining that his father abandoned the family to join Humarise, and that he and his siblings were ostracized as a result. The two are attacked at the Klayd border by Beros, but are saved by Bakugo and Todoroki, while Beros commits suicide in order to evade capture. 

Later, Midoriya discovers a hidden compartment in the briefcase containing a puzzle which Rody played with as a kid. Rody solves it and finds a USB device and a data disk inside. The disk contains a message from Kay, who reveals that he and Eddy Soul, Rody's father, were forced by Humarise to create the Trigger bombs. The device contains a kill code for the bombs created by Kay and Eddy. Humarise announces that they will detonate their remaining bombs in two hours, forcing the deployed Heroes to work through the ensuing global panic to find them. Midoriya and the others head to Humarise's headquarters with the device on a plane piloted by Rody. 

Bakugo and Todoroki deal with high-ranking Humarise goons, while Midoriya faces Flect Turn, whose Quirk reflects whatever comes into contact with him. Midoriya is overwhelmed by Flect Turn's natural defenses, as well as his laser barrage. Rody arrives and seemingly betrays Midoriya by handing over the device in exchange for his siblings' safety. However, thanks to Pino, who is actually Rody's sentient Quirk which expresses his true feelings and intentions, Midoriya realizes it is a feint and catches Flect Turn off guard. Realizing that Flect Turn's Quirk has a limit to how much damage it can take, Midoriya uses One for All Full Cowl at 100%, to defeat Flect Turn with a barrage of attacks. 

Meanwhile, Rody heads for the Trigger Bombs' control system, and despite being wounded by the laser defense system, he and Pino barely manage to insert the device in time, preventing the Trigger Bombs from activating. In the aftermath, Humarise's surviving members are arrested, while the Heroes are healed at the hospital. As Midoriya heads back to Japan, he and Rody bid a tearful goodbye to each other. Class 1-A reunites back at U.A., while Rody gets a job as a janitor, waiter, and dishwasher and pursues his dream of becoming a pilot.

Voice cast

Production
Before the release of My Hero Academia: Heroes Rising in December 2019, My Hero Academia manga creator Kōhei Horikoshi stated in July that "[probably] there won't be a third film", believing that the second film of the franchise was the "kind of finale for My Hero Academia. That is because its story uses one of the concepts [I] had wanted to use in the manga's final battle." In November 2020, each of the official Twitter accounts for My Hero Academia manga, anime series, and films posted tweets that could be combined to form the sentence "He will meet the three musketeers". Each tweet had links that would lead to images of Katsuki Bakugo, Izuku Midoriya, and Shoto Todoroki which could be combined to form a teaser visual for the third film of the franchise. After a week, the latest issue of Weekly Shōnen Jump magazine officially confirmed the film for a summer release.

In March 2021, the title of the film was revealed as My Hero Academia the Movie: World Heroes' Mission, which would be based on an original story, with Horikoshi serving as its chief supervisor and the original character designer. Additionally, Kenji Nagasaki was also revealed to be directing the film at Bones along with Yousuke Kuroda as the screenwriter and Yoshihiko Umakoshi as the character designer. The designs for "stealth suit" outfits of Midoriya, Bakugo, and Todoroki in the film were revealed in May 2021.

Ryo Yoshizawa joined the cast of the film as the original character named Rody Soul in May 2021, as did Kazuya Nakai and Megumi Hayashibara in June as the leader of an organization that threatens the world named Flect Turn and the trusted partner of Rody named Pino, respectively. Additional cast for the film were revealed in July 2021, including Mariya Ise as Belos, Junya Enoki as Sir Pentas, Yūichirō Umehara as Shidero, Shogo Sakata as Leviathan, Hirofumi Nojima as Allen Kay, and Yōko Honna as Claire Voyance.

Music
Yuki Hayashi was revealed to be composing My Hero Academia: World Heroes' Mission in March 2021, after previously doing so for My Hero Academia anime series and the franchise's films My Hero Academia: Two Heroes (2018) and Heroes Rising. In June 2021, Asian Kung-Fu Generation was revealed to be performing the theme music for the film titled . The following month, the 35th issue of Weekly Shōnen Jump magazine revealed the insert song in the film titled , also performed by the same band. The film's original soundtrack was released in Japan by Toho Animation Records and in the United States by Milan Records on August 6, 2021. Milan Records released the soundtrack on vinyl records in the United States in July 2022. That month, Anime Limited announced the release of the soundtrack on vinyl records in the United Kingdom and Ireland. Selected tracks from the soundtrack were remastered and included in the album My Hero Academia (Soundtrack Selection 2021–2023), which was released digitally in March 2023.

Marketing
A teaser trailer and the key visual drawn by Umakoshi for My Hero Academia: World Heroes' Mission were released in March 2021. A new visual for the film was released in June 2021. A bonus manga by Horikoshi titled My Hero Academia Vol. World Heroes was given to the first one million people who viewed the film in theaters in Japan. It was also given to the moviegoers who saw the film in theaters in the United States. A novel based on the film written by Anri Takahashi was published in Japan by Shueisha on August 6, 2021.

Promotional partners for the film included the sushi restaurant chain Kura Sushi; Tsutaya, which released their membership card T Card with designs based on Midoriya, Bakugo, and Todoroki; the bento take-out chain Hokka Hokka Tei; the steakhouse Ikinari Steak; the variety store Thank You Mart; the karaoke brand Joysound; and Good Smile Company, which released Nendoroids of Midoriya, Bakugo, and Todoroki wearing their stealth suits in the film.

Release

Theatrical
My Hero Academia: World Heroes' Mission was released in Japan on August 6, 2021, and received 4D screenings on August 28. The film held its American premiere at the Animation Is Film Festival in Los Angeles' TCL Chinese Theatre on October 24, 2021. It was released in Australia and New Zealand on October 28, 2021. The film was screened in the United States and Canada by Funimation, and in the United Kingdom and Ireland by Columbia Pictures on October 29, 2021.

Home media
My Hero Academia: World Heroes' Mission was released on Blu-ray and DVD in Japan on February 16, 2022. The "Plus Ultra" edition contains an original video animation titled , which is based on the chapter "No.XXX Hawks: SOOTHE" from Vol. World Heroes manga, and follows Midoriya, Bakugo, and Todoroki as they encounter Hawks in an airport terminal. The film was released on Blu-ray and DVD in the United States and Canada by Crunchyroll on August 23, 2022, and in the United Kingdom and Ireland by Funimation on September 26. Crunchyroll released the film along with Two Heroes and Heroes Rising on Blu-ray and DVD in a single pack, collectively titled My Hero Academia: 3-Movie Collection, in the United Kingdom on February 6, 2023.

Reception

Box office
My Hero Academia: World Heroes' Mission grossed million in Japan and million in other territories, for a worldwide total of million. It is the tenth highest-grossing domestic film of 2021 in Japan.

The film earned million on its opening day in Japan, 229.2% more than My Hero Academia: Heroes Rising (2019) did on its premiere. In its opening weekend, the film earned million, ranking second behind F9 (2021). The film reached the one-billion-yen mark in its second weekend and grossed billion (million) in its third weekend, becoming the highest-grossing film of the franchise. It placed first in its fourth weekend, fourth in its fifth weekend, and first again in its sixth weekend. The film reached the three-billion-yen mark in its seventh weekend, with its ranking dropping to sixth.

Outside Japan, the film earned million in its opening weekend in the United States and Canada, placing fourth behind No Time to Die (2021). In Australia, the film grossed  in its opening weekend, ranking fifth at the box office. In the United Kingdom and Ireland, the film made  from 260 theaters.

Critical response 
On the review aggregator website Rotten Tomatoes, the film holds an approval rating of 86% based on 29 reviews, with an average rating of 7.1/10. The website's critics consensus reads, "Fun for newcomers and existing fans alike, My Hero Academia: World Heroes' Mission is an entertaining interlude between seasons of the series." On Metacritic, the film has a weighted average score of 51 out of 100 based on 4 critic reviews, indicating "mixed or average reviews". Cinema Today reported that the film's audience had more females than the targeted male demographic, comprising 76.5%.

Rafael Motamayor gave My Hero Academia: World Heroes' Mission 8 out of 10 for IGN, praising its visuals that "out-Marvels the " and the villains' motives that he noted were inspired by the graphic novel X-Men: God Loves, Man Kills. He felt that the film "captures the heart of early Stan Lee and Steve Ditko Spider-Man comics", particularly the "grounded approach" to Deku with his newfound power and its "sheer optimism in the face of great stakes". Hayes Madsen of ComingSoon.net also gave the film 8 out of 10, noting the "bigger emphasis on exaggerated expressions for characters and action scenes". He praised its "sense of scale and gravitas that the past two films simply didn't have" due to the expanding world of the franchise but felt that the villain's development was "lacking".

Richard Eisenbeis of Anime News Network graded the film "C+", praising its animation and plot hook while criticizing the characters and their development. Writing for /Film, Caroline Cao felt that the film was "solid enough in its watchability, crowdpleasing action, sight gags, and core relationship" but criticized its lack of scope. Despite noting Deku's shiny relationship with Rody, she found the film did "little overtly novel with Deku's drive to become a Hero".

Maya Phillips of The New York Times was critical of the film, particularly its "rapid cuts and camera shifts [that] makes it dizzying to witness", the characters being ignored "for the sake of a formulaic plot and forgettable antagonist", and the final fight she described as "long and... perfunctory". She felt that the film was a "missable third film" of the franchise and had "little to offer veteran fans of the series or new viewers". Richard Whittaker of The Austin Chronicle gave the film two out of five stars, stating that it "never quite balances the darkness with the inherent plucky optimism and sporadic goofiness that makes the series so popular". He felt that World Heroes Mission would work better if it was a television series rather than a film "since the last 40 minutes is one big punch-a-thon, with most of the supporting cast yet again busy offscreen".

Accolades
In December 2021, My Hero Academia: World Heroes' Mission was among the Top 100 Favorites nominated for the Anime of the Year at the Tokyo Anime Award Festival 2022. In October 2022, the film was nominated for Best Picture (Film) Award at the Newtype Anime Awards. In December 2022, the film was placed first on U-NEXT's "The Best 10 Most Popular Works in 2022" list for Anime Rental category.

References

External links
  
 
 

2020s Japanese superhero films
2021 anime films
2021 films
Anime films based on manga
Bones (studio)
Films scored by Yuki Hayashi
Films with screenplays by Yōsuke Kuroda
Funimation
Japanese animated superhero films
2020s Japanese-language films
My Hero Academia
Animated superhero films
Toho animated films